Devonport Football Club is an Australian rules football club based in Devonport, Tasmania. The club currently competes in the North West Football League (NWFL). The club previously competed in the Northern Tasmanian Football League, but from 2009 it joined the newly reformed Tasmanian State League, where it played until withdrawing before the 2018 season.

History

Northern Tasmanian Football League
The collapse of statewide football in late 2000 saw Devonport revert to a regional competition, in this case the Northern Tasmanian Football League (NTFL), but with only 9 wins from 20 matches for the year the club finished 8th (out of 12), a result it failed to improve on in 2002.

In 2003, however, the Magpies surged up the ladder to qualify for the finals, while the next year they went within one game – albeit a game in which they were conclusively vanquished by Burnie – of a flag. The 2005 season brought another grand final appearance, and another loss to Burnie, albeit this time by the comparatively more respectable margin of just 17 points.  Then, in 2006, hopes that it might be third time lucky were conclusively dashed on grand final day by a much more talented and cohesive Launceston side, which ultimately won with ease by 57 points. The 2007 season brought a marginal decline in fortunes as the Magpies, having topped the ladder prior to the finals, bowed out of flag contention in straight sets after defeats by eventual premiers Launceston in the second semi final, and Ulverstone in the preliminary final.  Kurt Heazlewood's Baldock Medal victory as the competition's best and fairest player provided a small measure of consolation.

Move to Tasmanian State League
The Devonport Football Club accepted an invitation to join the new Tasmanian State League in 2009. After a meeting of club members, delegates and supporters, the club unanimously voted to leave the NTFL and join the new league. The club began their foray back into Statewide football with distinction in their first two seasons, with a first semi final loss to eventual premier Clarence in 2009 and a surprise Grand Final appearance the following season, again meeting Clarence at Bellerive Oval, but there was to be no fairytale as the Coastal Magpies were swept aside by the reigning premier by 57 points.

Financial ruin
Just three months after competing in a Grand Final, financial disaster was to beset the club, on 10 December 2010 the Devonport Football Club was to announce that they were facing a debt of $507,525 and faced impending collapse should a white knight not be found. AFL Tasmania's CEO Scott Wade announcing that the club had fourteen days to prove to the sport's governing body that they were able to put plans in place to reduce the debt or they would face immediate expulsion from the Tasmanian State League for poor financial management. The NTFL stating that they would not let Devonport Football Club back into their competition should this eventuate and cross-town rival East Devonport refusing to enter into amalgamation talks with the club would most likely see the club go into extinction. The club is no stranger to financial turmoil, having been in trouble for most of the previous twenty years stemming back to their appointment of former Hawthorn legend Peter Knights as senior coach in 1990. By 1998 Devonport were close to extinction with a debt of $709,067 and were only saved by an approximately $246,000 loan from the Devonport Council in order to pay off some of their creditors. Urban legend amongst football writers and punters on the North West Coast was that the club were well known to have been in almost a quarter of a million dollars debt when they joined the TSL in late 2008, but the full extent of the financial problems were not known by AFL Tasmania until the sport's governing body appointed an independent administrator to oversee the running of the club in late 2010 whereby the extent of the financial problems were fully disclosed as Devonport Council also called in their loan to the club at the same time. After a change of board of directors, the club were granted donations of approximately $200,000 by a number of North Western businessmen and other supporters in the community and as such, were granted permission to remain a member of the Tasmanian State League.

2011 and onwards
After being runners up to Clarence in the State League Final in 2010, there was an exodus of players at club while the coaching panel was being decided for 2011. Errol Bourn was appointed head coach after a long process but resigned due to personal reasons leaving the Magpies without a coach and players leaving. The Board then appointed former Ulverstone Under 19 Premiership Winning Coach Glen Lutwyche to the role. Due to the dire financial state of the club the board resigned in December following revelations the club was more than $500,000 in debt, with a $103,000 rescue package to meet immediate liabilities contingent on the majority of the board resigning, apart from directors Shane Yates, Shane Lee and Leon Perry. On 4 February, a special general meeting was called to introduce the new directors to the members and playing group. The new directors endorsed include multiple world champion woodchopper David Foster, former assistant coach Mark Fagan, former East Devonport Football Club president Peter Mitchell, former players Pat Fagan and Barry Duckett, supporter Peter McConnon, and marketing consultant Trudi Jones. Shane Yates was confirmed as the new president at this meeting. The playing group was left battered by the player exodus which included star midfielder Kurt Heazlewood moving to WA for work and forward Ben Reynolds signing at Glenorchy. The club has started to put back together there playing list by signing Ulverstone pair Justin Rodman and Tim Mee.

After the departure of Glen Lutwyche as coach, the DFC brought in Paul Griffths to lead the team in 2013. After what some had described as a big pre season for the Magpies with an improved list and developing youngsters, Griffths' reign only lasted 5 games before he resigned. Griffths had only coached the team to a memorable ANZAC day clash win over eventual preliminary finalists Launceston in round three before he suddenly resigned after a big loss to South Launceston in round five. This brought under 18s coach Max Brown to the role of Senior coach where he set upon building the list and getting games in younger players. This strategy would come at a price with the Magpies only winning one more game for the rest of the year. Browns young team did show signs of improvement and with these good signs, Brown signed on to coach in 2014. Klay Griffths won his first Lance Cox Medal ahead of Quade Byard and Bodie Murphy won his first Noël Hetherington Memorial ahead of highly touted youngster Benjamin Hawkes.

Season 2014 has seen many new faces arrive at the club. Brayden Butler, Brayden Stevenson and Matthew Sheehan from Latrobe, Callen Newman from East Devonport and Scott Jaffery from Wesley Vale have all signed on for season 2014. The club also welcome back Brad Symmons and Corey Plumbridge from injury and retirement. The club lost Justin Rodman and Jack Vanderfeen to Ulverstone, Brennan Kendal to Queensland and Quade Byard to a knee injury.

Return to NWFL
In 2018, the club withdrew from the Tasmanian State League.

Summary
Stadium: Devonport Oval – 1937–present.
Club formed – 6 March 1890
Colours – Black and white.
Emblem – Magpies (Blues from 1987–1996 and Power from 1997–2000)

Statistics
Record home roster match attendance – TFL Statewide League
4,046 – Devonport v Burnie Hawks – 25 April 1989 at Devonport Oval

Record finals attendance – TFL Statewide League
17,878 – Devonport v Glenorchy – 1988 TFL Grand Final at North Hobart Oval

Record home attendance – Tasmanian State League
Not available

Record finals attendance – Tasmanian State League
6,123 – Clarence v Devonport – 18 September 2010 at Bellerive Oval

Club record score
37.9 (231) v Launceston 10.6 (66) – 21 July 1996 at Devonport Oval

Club record quarter
14.4 (88) v New Norfolk – 16 April 1988 at Devonport Oval

Club record games holder
 247* Alan Clements

Honours

Club
Tasmanian Football League
 Premiers (1): 1988
 Runners-up (1): 2010
North West Football Union (7): 1914, 1915, 1925, 1934, 1936, 1938, 1981
North West Football League (2): 2021, 2022

Individual
William Leitch Medallists
1987 – David Code
1997 – Fabian Carelli
1998 – Wayne Weidemann
Tassie Medallists
2009 – Kurt Heazlewood
Darrel Baldock Medallists
2007 – Kurt Heazlewood
Cheel Medallists (NWFU best and fairest player from 1923–1929)
1925 – W. Berryman
Royal Medallists (NWFU East best and fairest player in 1930)
1930 – W. Berryman
Wander Medallists (NWFU best and fairest player from 1948–1986)
1974 – Cec Rheinberger
1976 – K. Coates
1978 – Jim Prentice
Lefroy Medal  (Best on ground for Tasmania in representative games)
2010 – Ben Reynolds
TFL Statewide League leading goalkicker
1988 – Chris Reynolds (111)
1998 – Ken Rainsford (94)
NTFL leading goalkickers
2002 – Matthew Langmaid  (88)
2003 – Matthew Langmaid  (88)
2007 – Phillip Crowden  (111)
NWFU leading goalkickers
1914 – G. Foley (28)
1924 – P. Martyn (34)
1936 – A. Cooke (77)

Past senior coaches

1890 – J. Jones
1891 – R. Langworthy
1892–1899  – T. Wingrove
1900 – Club in recess
1901–1905 – J. Savage
1906–1908 – S. Ashley
1909–1910 – Unknown
1911 – W. Pearce
1912 – A. Knox
1913 – A. Hennigan
1914 – C. Hardstaff
1915 – E. Hatton
1916–1919 – Break due to World War I
1920 – T. Lindley
1921 – A. E. Hatton
1922 – J. Foley
1923 – J. Heaney
1924–1926 – Percy Martyn
1927 – J. Dunn
1928 – J. Brown
1929 – A. Soden
1930 – Bill Berryman
1931 – R. Mather
1931–1935 – H. Baker
1936 – C. A. Eyles
1936 – M. Baker
1937 – G. Bourke
1937 – A. Brown
1938–1939 – G. Cole
1940 – C. Milburne
1941–1944 – Break due to World War II
1945 – P. Schmidt
1946 – J. O'Keefe
1947 – J. Jordan
1948 – H. Murray
1949 – A. Hutton
1950–1951 – N. Richardson
1952–1953 – R. Witzerman
1954 – A. Deaton
1955 – R. Cullen
1956 – N. Gelavis
1957–1958 – R. Jobson
1959–1963 – Neil Conlan
1964–1965 – Jervis Stokes
1965–1967 – Peter Lyon
1968–1969 – T. McKay
1970–1971 – Geoff Martin
1972–1973 – Roland Crosby
1974 – C. Hutchins
1975–1976 – Bob Withers
1976 – G. A. Green
1977 – J. Bates
1978 – Jim Prentice
1979–1984 – N. Johnson
1985 – B. S. Lane
1986 – Mark Williams
1987–1989 – Roland Crosby
1990–1993 – Peter Knights
1994–1996 – Andy Goodwin
1997–1998 – M. Brown
1999 – R. Spencer
2000–2007 – D. Perry
2008 – Steve Reissig
2009–2010 – Errol Bourn 
2011–2012 – Glen Lutwyche
2013  - Paul Griffths / Max Brown 
2014 - Max Brown
2015–2017 - Mitch Thorp

Lance Cox Medal 
In 2012 the Devonport Football Club named its best and fairest award after club stalwart Lance Cox. These are the following best and fairest winners since the TSL started in 2009:
2009 – C. Hardy
2010 – K. Heazlewood
2011 - J.Rodman 
Lance Cox Medalists
2012 - J.Soden 
2013 - K.Griffths 
2014 - K.Pitchford

In 2012 the Devonport Football Club named its colts best and fairest after Noel Hetherington. The following winners have been: 
2012 - Matthew Damon and Ashley O'Donnell 
2013 - Bodie Murphy

VFL/AFL players
Notable players that went on the play in the VFL/AFL:
 Grant Birchall
 Brady Rawlings
 Jade Rawlings
 Matthew Richardson
 Ben Harrison
 Dion Scott (Brisbane Bears)
 Matthew Febey
 Steven Febey

References

External links

Official Facebook

Australian rules football clubs in Tasmania
Sport in Devonport, Tasmania
Australian rules football clubs established in 1890
1890 establishments in Australia
Tasmanian Football League clubs
North West Football League clubs